Kolbark  is a village in the administrative district of Gmina Klucze, within Olkusz County, Lesser Poland Voivodeship, in southern Poland.

The village has a population of 510.

References

Kolbark